New Zealand contributed ten contingents of mounted rifles towards the British Crown's efforts in the Second Boer War (also known as the South Africa War). The British Government accepted the offer by Richard Seddonthe Premier of New Zealandfor troops, and so the country became the first British colony to volunteer forces for the war. A total of ten contingents departed for South Africa between October 1899 and April 1902. The volunteers of the first two contingents were mainly members of New Zealand's existing permanent or voluntary forces and were expected to supply their own equipment and horses. The Third and Fourth Contingents were organised by regional politicians and businesspeople: the Third organised mainly from Canterbury, and the Fourth from Otago. These two Contingents were also largely paid for through local fundraising rather than central government, and together they became known as the Rough Riders. The remaining contingents were funded by the British Government. The Boer War was the first overseas conflict to involve New Zealand troops, and was the first conflict the nation was involved in since the New Zealand Wars had ceased in the early 1870s. Over 6500 New Zealand soldiers served in South Africa with the units suffering 230 casualtiesmost of those from either accident or disease.

Contingents

See also 

 Military history of New Zealand
 List of Second Boer War Victoria Cross recipients

Citations

References

External sources
Embarkation database with every New Zealand soldier who joined the New Zealand contingents

Military units and formations of the New Zealand Army
Military units and formations of the Second Boer War